Independence is a fundamental notion in probability theory, as in statistics and the theory of stochastic processes. Two events are independent, statistically independent, or stochastically independent if, informally speaking, the occurrence of one does not affect the probability of occurrence of the other or, equivalently, does not affect the odds. Similarly, two random variables are independent if the realization of one does not affect the probability distribution of the other.

When dealing with collections of more than two events, two notions of independence need to be distinguished. The events are called pairwise independent if any two events in the collection are independent of each other, while mutual independence (or collective independence)  of events means, informally speaking, that each event is independent of any combination of other events in the collection. A similar notion exists for collections of random variables. Mutual independence implies pairwise independence, but not the other way around. In the standard literature of probability theory, statistics, and stochastic processes, independence without further qualification usually refers to mutual independence.

Definition

For events

Two events

 indicates that two independent events  and  have common elements in their sample space so that they are not mutually exclusive (mutually exclusive iff ). Why this defines independence is made clear by rewriting with conditional probabilities  as the probability at which the event  occurs provided that the event  has or is assumed to have occurred:

and similarly

Odds
Analogously with probability, this is equivalent to the conditional odds being equal to the unconditional odds:

or to the odds of one event, given the other event, being the same as the odds of the event, given the other event not occurring:

The odds ratio can be defined as

or symmetrically for odds of  given , and thus is 1 if and only if the events are independent.

More than two events
A finite set of events  is pairwise independent if every pair of events is independent—that is, if and only if for all distinct pairs of indices ,

A finite set of events is mutually independent if every event is independent of any intersection of the other events—that is, if and only if for every  and for every k indices ,

This is called the multiplication rule for independent events. Note that it is not a single condition involving only the product of all the probabilities of all single events; it must hold true for all subsets of events.

For more than two events, a mutually independent set of events is (by definition) pairwise independent; but the converse is not necessarily true.

Log probability and information content
Stated in terms of log probability, two events are independent if and only if the log probability of the joint event is the sum of the log probability of the individual events:

In information theory, negative log probability is interpreted as information content, and thus two events are independent if and only if the information content of the combined event equals the sum of information content of the individual events:

See  for details.

For real valued random variables

Two random variables

More than two random variables
A finite set of  random variables  is pairwise independent if and only if every pair of random variables is independent. Even if the set of random variables is pairwise independent, it is not necessarily mutually independent as defined next.

A finite set of  random variables  is mutually independent if and only if for any sequence of numbers , the events  are mutually independent events (as defined above in ). This is equivalent to the following condition on the joint cumulative distribution function  A finite set of  random variables  is mutually independent if and only if

Notice that it is not necessary here to require that the probability distribution factorizes for all possible  subsets as in the case for  events. This is not required because e.g.  implies .

The measure-theoretically inclined may prefer to substitute events  for events  in the above definition, where  is any Borel set.  That definition is exactly equivalent to the one above when the values of the random variables are real numbers.  It has the advantage of working also for complex-valued random variables or for random variables taking values in any measurable space (which includes topological spaces endowed by appropriate σ-algebras).

For real valued random vectors

For stochastic processes

For one stochastic process
The definition of independence may be extended from random vectors to a stochastic process. Therefore, it is required for an independent stochastic process that the random variables obtained by sampling the process at any  times  are independent random variables for any .

Formally, a stochastic process  is called independent, if and only if for all  and for all 

where  Independence of a stochastic process is a property within a stochastic process, not between two stochastic processes.

For two stochastic processes
Independence of two stochastic processes is a property between two stochastic processes  and  that are defined on the same probability space .

Independent σ-algebras
The definitions above ( and ) are both generalized by the following definition of independence for σ-algebras.

Likewise, a finite family of σ-algebras , where  is an index set, is said to be independent if and only if

and an infinite family of σ-algebras is said to be independent if all its finite subfamilies are independent.

The new definition relates to the previous ones very directly:
 Two events are independent (in the old sense) if and only if the σ-algebras that they generate are independent (in the new sense).  The σ-algebra generated by an event  is, by definition,

Probability zero events cannot affect independence so independence also holds if  is only Pr-almost surely constant.

Properties

Self-independence
Note that an event is independent of itself if and only if

Thus an event is independent of itself if and only if it almost surely occurs or its complement almost surely occurs; this fact is useful when proving zero–one laws.

Expectation and covariance

and the covariance  is zero, as follows from

The converse does not hold: if two random variables have a covariance of 0 they still may be not independent.  See uncorrelated.

Similarly for two stochastic processes  and : If they are independent, then they are uncorrelated.

Characteristic function

In particular the characteristic function of their sum is the product of their marginal characteristic functions:

though the reverse implication is not true.  Random variables that satisfy the latter condition are called subindependent.

Examples

Rolling dice
The event of getting a 6 the first time a die is rolled and the event of getting a 6 the second time are independent. By contrast, the event of getting a 6 the first time a die is rolled and the event that the sum of the numbers seen on the first and second trial is 8 are not independent.

Drawing cards
If two cards are drawn with replacement from a deck of cards, the event of drawing a red card on the first trial and that of drawing a red card on the second trial are independent. By contrast, if two cards are drawn without replacement from a deck of cards, the event of drawing a red card on the first trial and that of drawing a red card on the second trial are  not independent, because a deck that has had a red card removed has proportionately fewer red cards.

Pairwise and mutual independence

Consider the two probability spaces shown. The random variables in the second space are both pairwise independent and mutually independent. To illustrate the difference, consider conditioning on two events. In the pairwise independent case, although any one event is independent of each of the other two individually, it is not independent of the intersection of the other two:

In the mutually independent case, however,

Triple-independence but no pairwise-independence

It is possible to create a three-event example in which

and yet no two of the three events are pairwise independent (and hence the set of events are not mutually independent). This example shows that mutual independence involves requirements on the products of probabilities of all combinations of events, not just the single events as in this example.

Conditional independence

For events

.

For random variables

The formal definition of conditional independence is based on the idea of conditional distributions.

for all ,  and  such that .

for all real numbers ,  and  such that .

A similar equation holds for the conditional probability density functions in the continuous case.

Independence can be seen as a special kind of conditional independence, since probability can be seen as a kind of conditional probability given no events.

See also
 Copula (statistics)
 Independent and identically distributed random variables
 Mutually exclusive events
Pairwise independent events
 Subindependence
 Conditional independence
 Normally distributed and uncorrelated does not imply independent
 Mean dependence

References

External links

 
Experiment (probability theory)